Yahya Ale Eshaq (born 6 June 1949 in Qom origin from Zanjan) is an Iranian politician who served as minister of commerce in the cabinet of Akbar Hashemi Rafsanjani from 1993 to 1997. He is also the head of the commerce center of Tehran from 2009. He was one of the potential candidates for the 2013 presidential election but was declined his candidacy on 11 May 2013.

References

External links

1949 births
Living people
Government ministers of Iran
Islamic Coalition Party politicians
People from Qom
People from Zanjan, Iran
Popular Front of Islamic Revolution Forces politicians